The Shin'a'in (translation: People of the Plains) are a fictional ethnographic group created by fantasy author Mercedes Lackey.  They comprise roughly half of the descendants of an ancient race, the Kaled'a'in; the other half are the Tale'edras (Brothers of the Hawk).  They are characterized by their chosen homeland, the Dhorisha Plains, an enormous grassland in the bottom of a great crater, and by their refusal to use magic except as part of the shamanic rituals.  They resemble the Bedouins in lifestyle; they are nomadic, living in tents, and they are predominantly herders and horse-breeders.  

The Shin'a'in are also traders, and have a semi-permanent settlement, Kata'shin'a'in, on the rim of the Plains.  They are characterized by a certain racial type; black-haired, blue-eyed, with golden skin.  

Shin'a'in worship their deity in the form of a Goddess, Kal'enel (Sword of the Stars, or The Star-Eyed) with four aspects; Maiden, Warrior, Mother, Crone. They also have a male deity who does not appear much in the books. Like the Goddess, he has four aspects that correspond to the four aspects of the Goddess: the Rover, Guardian, Hunter and Guide.

Horses
The Shin'a'in are famous for their relationship to their horses, whom they often refer to as dester'edre (Wind-born Siblings), or ever-younger clanschildren (Jel'sutho'edrin).

The Shin'a'in horses are famous for their quality, especially the warsteeds.  A warsteed off the Plains is always female: the Shin'a'in prefer the mares for their intelligence. No Shin'a'in warsteed is ever permitted to belong to a non-Shin'a'in, and they are never sold. Battlemares, as they are known, are distinguished as being ugly, as they are bred for their brains, agility and muscle rather than for looks. In appearance they are somewhat coarse, with large, broad foreheads, dusty gray coats and muscular quarters (the hindquarters often somewhat higher than the forequarters). They are trained to allow only their riders to handle or ride them, and will seriously injure or (more often) kill anybody unauthorized who comes close to them. 

The studs never leave the plains, and the only Shin'a'in horses sold to outsiders are their saddle-beasts and their culls, which are of entirely different breeding stock to the warsteeds (though highly superior to non-Shin'a'in horses).

History
The Shin'a'in and Tale'edras became two separate peoples at the Sundering of the Clans, an event remembered with some sorrow.  A great war between Urtho, a wise and good mage, and Ma'ar, an evil one, resulted in the death of both and the destruction of their citadels.  Ma'ar's fortress became a crater that filled with water and was later named Lake Evendim.  Urtho's tower become a massive crater covered in black glass.  The Goddess appeared to the Kaled'a'in and gave them two tasks: The Clans who were given the first task were to use magic to restore the damage done to the land through magic; these people became the Tale'edras.  The Clans who shunned the use of any magic except for that of the Shaman were to live in the crater and guard the weapons still sealed in Urtho's tower.  The clans who accepted the second task became the Shin'a'in, and the Goddess covered the ruined land with grass so that they could live there. This re-populating of the Plains came at a great cost: the lives of the Elders of the four Clans who were the first of the Shin'a'in (Hawk, Wolf, Grass-Cat, and Deer). This gave the Plains their name - the Dhorisha Shin'a, the Plains of Sacrifice.

There was also a Kaled'a'in clan that had gated so far out from the others that they were considered the Lost Clan, the k'Leshya.  The k'Leshya reunited with the others during the Mage Wars and Mage Storms near 2400 years later, per Mercedes Lackey's timelines found in the Valdemar novels.

Roles and social organization
The Shin'a'in are organized in Clans named for a totemic animal (Clan of the Cat, Clan of the Hawk, etc. E.g.: Liha'irden as Clan of the Racing Deer, or Tale'sedrin as Children of the Hawk.)  They have a clan elder and a shaman (or several shamans) who rule the Clan.  The shamans are the only magic users; children born to the Clan who have the ability to use magic must join the shamans or leave the Plains to join Tayledras for training.  If they wish to do neither, then the Shaman will call upon the Goddess to seal away the touch of magic and the child will continue to live life in the Clan.  

The Shin'a'in clan has several pivotal members: the Clan Elders, Shaman and Healers, in addition to a Clanmother. Clan is so important to the Shin'a'in that a Shin'a'in Clanless is considered as having no reason to live. They live and die for their Clans.

Shamans
Shamans are the spiritual leaders of the Shin'a'in.  They hold a great place of respect within the Clans.  They are the keepers of outClan knowledge.  Shamans can be distinguished as they wear simple headdresses with two small deer antlers.  The Shaman possess their own type of Kal'enedral who instead of warriors are scholars and keepers of knowledge. These Scrollsworn, as they are known, wear a dark navy blue, and are as devoted to the preservation of the Clan and outClan knowledge and history, as the Swordsworn are to the way of the fighting and combat.

Kal'enedral
A sub-group of Shin'a'in is a class of warriors known as the Kal'enedral (literally Her Sword Brothers, or Sword Sworn).  Such persons swear an oath to the Goddess for various reasons; one famous Kal'enedral was Tarma shena Tale'sedrin, who took the oath to avenge her Clan after every member but herself was murdered by bandits. 

Blood-feud is forbidden amongst the Shin'a'in. In order to pursue blood-feud or revenge, the oath of Kal'enedral must be sworn. This oath is in three parts: first, the Kal'enedral are Sworn to the Goddess of the South Wind and the New Moon (the Warrior), secondly they are Sworn to the service of the Shin'a'in Clans as a whole, and only then are they Sworn to their particular clan. This arrangement precludes inter-clan rivalry, and no Shin'a'in may take up arms against another. 

Kalen'edral are celibate, entirely without sexual desire (the Goddess removes it to free them from distraction) and are frequently androgynous. Ordinary Kal'enedral dress only in dark brown or black: the black is only worn when on blood-feud or engaging in ritual combat.   

Kal'enedral continue to serve their Goddess after death; they are leshy'a-Kal'enedral (spirit-Kal'enedral) and are distinguished by their black clothing, normally only worn when the Kal'enedral is on blood-feud, and veiled faces (giving them the nickname "the Veiled Ones"). It is the Veiled Ones who are entrusted with the training of the living Kal'enedral: on every night spent not within the confines of a building, the Veiled Ones will train the Kal'enedral in weapons-work. This makes a Kal'enedral one of the most feared and accomplished warriors in the world.

Blood-Oath
The Shin'a'in are notoriously clan-conscious, and do not normally have a great deal of contact with outsiders. Occasionally, however, one will swear the oath of She'enedran (Blood Brother/Sister) with an outlander. 

This oath involves each participant making a small, crescent shaped incision on their right palm and joining hands to mingle the blood. The bond of She'enedran renders the bondmates closer than siblings or lovers, and allows them to feel a little of what the other is feeling (and if one is in danger, the other will know it). 

It was in this way that Tarma shena Tale'sedrin and her She'enedra, the sorceress Kethryveris (Kethry) repopulated the core clan of Tale'sedrin, for by swearing the oath Kethry became Shin'a'in by adoption. Tale'sedrin was repopulated by the children of Kethry and her husband Jadrek, in addition to receiving adoptees from other Clans. From then on, the Tale'sedrin were renowned as being the only Shin'a'in Clan to have blond-haired and/or green-eyed members.

Fictional civilizations